Marit Røsberg Jacobsen (born 25 February 1994) is a Norwegian handball player for Team Esbjerg and the Norwegian national team.

She also represented Norway in the 2013 Women's Junior European Handball Championship, placing 4th, and in the 2014 Women's Junior World Handball Championship, placing 9th.

She made her debut on the Norwegian national team 1 June 2016.

Achievements
Olympic Games:
Bronze: 2020
World Championship:
Winner: 2021
Silver Medalist: 2017
European Championship:
Winner: 2020
Youth European Championship:
Bronze Medalist: 2011
World Youth Championship:
Bronze Medalist: 2012
EHF Cup:
Finalist: 2019
Danish League:
Gold Medalist: 2019/2020

Individual awards
 All-Star Right Wing of the Youth World Championship: 2012
 All-Star Right Wing of Grundigligaen: 2015/2016
 All-Star Right Wing of Eliteserien: 2017/2018
 All-Star Right Wing of Damehåndboldligaen: 2018/2019, 2019/2020, 2020/2021

References

External links
 
 
 Marit Røsberg Jacobsen at the Norwegian Handball Federation 
 
 

1994 births
Living people
People from Narvik
Norwegian female handball players
Expatriate handball players
Norwegian expatriate sportspeople in Denmark
Handball players at the 2020 Summer Olympics
Medalists at the 2020 Summer Olympics
Olympic medalists in handball
Olympic bronze medalists for Norway
Sportspeople from Nordland
Olympic handball players of Norway
21st-century Norwegian women